James Pandu is a 2000 Indian Tamil-language comedy thriller film directed by Selva. The film stars Parthiban, Prabhu Deva, Kausalya and Renu Desai.

Plot 
James and Pandu are porters. Though they were inseparable friends before, there is no love lost between them now. James is in love with Renu, while Kausalya, a mute, has feelings for Pandu. A chit fund company owner hires James to 'steal' a bag of money from himself so he could abscond with the money, but his manager hires Pandu to steal the bag from James. When James and Pandu lay their hands on the money, they become friends again and decide to split the money. However, the company owner is found murdered, and they become the prime suspects. In the climax, Raghavachari comes to court and tells the truth that he killed the company owner because the latter would cheat many people. James and Pandu are both proven innocent.

Cast

Production 
The film saw Parthiban and Prabhu Deva acting together for first time, though they appeared previously together in Suyamvaram but they did not have any scenes together. Selva had initially titled the film as Visil, before renaming the project. Isha Koppikar was initially cast in the film, but dropped out and was replaced by Renu Desai. The first shot was taken at the Arunachalam studios. The unit picturised two songs in the snowy and hilly areas of Gangtok in Sikkim. The unit, that got the permission to shoot there, had much difficulty picturising the songs in the cold hilly area, but have returned triumphant. Participating in the songs were Prabhu Deva and Renu. A ten days shooting schedule in Chennai followed by shooting, at places like Hyderabad, Chalakkudi and Mercara.

Soundtrack 
Soundtrack was composed by S. A. Rajkumar.

Reception 
India Info wrote "In the name of comedy the two heroes indulge in so many senseless antics that it makes you sick. As the story is credited to R Parthipan he is solely responsible for this disaster". The Hindu wrote, "A film that begins on an interesting note but soon dwindles into something different". Malini Mannath wrote for Chennai Online, "James Pandu is Selva's ' holiday special,' where one doesn't have to tax one's intelligence at all. So enjoy it kids!". Kalki wrote that in order to make a comedy, the makers chose a plot with thriller which is quite strong, they could have made a thriller instead of comedy.

References

External links 

2000 films
2000s comedy thriller films
2000s Tamil-language films
Films directed by Selva (director)
Films scored by S. A. Rajkumar
Films shot in Chalakudy
Films shot in Chennai
Films shot in Hyderabad, India
Films shot in Kerala
Films shot in Sikkim
Films shot in Thrissur
Indian comedy thriller films